Sundeep Rajan (born 26 September 1989) is an Indian former cricketer. He played three first-class matches for Hyderabad between 2012 and 2013.

See also
 List of Hyderabad cricketers

References

External links
 

1989 births
Living people
Indian cricketers
Hyderabad cricketers
People from Secunderabad
Cricketers from Hyderabad, India